Zygmunt Józef Anczok (born 14 March 1946 in Lubliniec) is a former Polish footballer who played as a left-sided defender, who was an Olympic champion for Poland in the 1972 Summer Olympics.

His biggest success came in 1972 when he won the Polish cup as well as appearing in several Polish international matches. His international career began in 1965 when he played against Scotland. At the time of his arrival in the national game, a player of such speed and agility was practically unheard of in Poland, and he frequently was substituted into games to bring to his teams extra power in not just defense, but attack.

Anczok was given an opportunity in 1966 to go on a tour of South America, where he more than held his own against players such as Pelé. Numerous minor injuries gave him problems throughout the years to come, including in the 1974 FIFA World Cup. He continued to play in Norway in the late seventies, before retiring as a player in 1979 and heading into management. He originally managed in Poland before health problems forced him into relinquishing his duties.

References

Footballers at the 1972 Summer Olympics
Olympic footballers of Poland
Olympic gold medalists for Poland
Poland international footballers
Polish footballers
Polonia Bytom players
Górnik Zabrze players
Polish football managers
1946 births
Living people
People from Lubliniec
Olympic medalists in football
Skeid Fotball players
Sportspeople from Silesian Voivodeship
Polish expatriate footballers
Expatriate footballers in Norway
Polish expatriate sportspeople in Norway
Medalists at the 1972 Summer Olympics
Association football defenders
American Soccer League (1933–1983) players
Chicago Cats players
Expatriate soccer players in the United States
Polish expatriate sportspeople in the United States